Kurtziella margaritifera, common name the pearl-studded mangelia, is a species of sea snail, a marine gastropod mollusk in the family Mangeliidae.

Description

Distribution
K. margaritifera can be found in the Gulf of Mexico, ranging from the eastern Florida seaboard along the coast to Louisiana.

It was also found as a fossil in Pliocene strata of North St. Petersburg, Florida, USA.

References

 Rosenberg, G., F. Moretzsohn, and E. F. García. 2009. Gastropoda (Mollusca) of the Gulf of Mexico, Pp. 579–699 in Felder, D.L. and D.K. Camp (eds.), Gulf of Mexico–Origins, Waters, and Biota. Biodiversity. Texas A&M Press, College Station, Texas
 Fargo, W. G. 1953. Pliocene Mollusca of Southern Florida. Part II. The Pliocene Turridae of Saint Petersburg, Florida Monographs of the Academy of Natural Sciences of Philadelphia 18 365–409, pls. 16-24

External links

margaritifera
Gastropods described in 1953